Elżbieta Gabryszak (born 6 August 1998) is a Polish figure skater. She is the 2017 Crystal Skate of Romania champion, the 2019 Open d'Andorra silver medalist, the 2018 Warsaw Cup bronze medalist, and a two-time Polish national champion (2017, 2018).

Personal life 
Gabryszak was born on 6 August 1998 in Tychy.

Career

Early years 
Gabryszak began learning to skate in 2003. Coached by Iwona Mydlarz-Chruścińska, she made her junior international debut in November 2012. In September 2015, she competed at an ISU Junior Grand Prix event.

2016–2017 season 
Gabryszak's senior international debut came in November 2016 at the Warsaw Cup. She won her first senior national title in December at the Four National Championships in Katowice.

2017–2018 season 
In October 2017, Gabryszak took gold at the Crystal Skate of Romania. At Four Nationals, held in December in Košice, she won her second national title. She placed 34th at the 2018 European Championships in Moscow, Russia.

2018–2019 season 
Gabryszak was awarded the bronze medal at the Warsaw Cup in November 2018. At Four Nationals in Budapest, she finished second among the Polish competitors, behind Ekaterina Kurakova, who was not yet eligible to compete internationally. In January, Gabryszak placed 25th at the 2019 European Championships in Minsk, Belarus.

Programs

Competitive highlights
CS: Challenger Series; JGP: Junior Grand Prix

References

External links
 
 Elżbieta Gabryszak at the Polish Figure Skating Association
 Elżbieta Gabryszak at Stats on Ice

1998 births
Living people
Polish female single skaters
People from Tychy
Competitors at the 2019 Winter Universiade